Alasdair Pollock (born 24 October 1993) is an English cricketer, who played first-class cricket for Cambridge MCCU. A right-arm medium-pacer, Pollock scored 44 not out on his first-class debut, against Essex County Cricket Club, at number 9 in the order, out of a total of just 99. Pollock played 7 further first-class matches between 2013-2015.  In his second match against Essex County Cricket Club in 2014, Pollock dismissed the then England Test Cricket captain Alastair Cook in both innings.

Pollock studied at Royal Grammar School, Worcester and, for sixth form, Shrewsbury School, then afterwards at Robinson College, Cambridge, where he obtained a BA in geography. He captained the Cambridge blues cricket team to T20 and four-day glory, but was not as successful in the one-day format.

References

1993 births
Living people
Sportspeople from High Wycombe
People educated at Shrewsbury School
Alumni of Robinson College, Cambridge
English cricketers
Cambridge University cricketers
Cambridge MCCU cricketers